Daniel Dulany the Elder (1685–1753) was a prominent lawyer and land-developer in colonial Maryland, who held a number of colonial offices. In 1722 Dulany wrote a pamphlet entitled The Right of the Inhabitants of Maryland, to the Benefit of the English Laws, asserting the rights of Marylanders over the Proprietary Government.

Early life

Dulany was born in Upperwoods, Queen's County, Ireland about 1685. In November 1702, a flotilla of merchantmen, known as the "Armada of 100 ships" Sailed for the Chesapeake Bay, arriving in March, 1703. Dulany, along with two older brothers (William and Joseph) landing at Port Tobacco, and became indentured to Colonel George Plater II for a three-year period. Plater put Dulany to work as a law clerk. In 1706, after the indenture was over, Dulany traveled to London, in order to study law.

Dulany returned to Maryland and in 1709 was admitted to the Charles County bar.

Politics
In 1720, Dulany moved to Annapolis. In 1722, he was elected to represent the town in the Maryland General Assembly where he was to serve for the next twenty years.

At that time the Province of Maryland was under the proprietary governorship of Charles Calvert, 5th Baron Baltimore. Lord Baltimore vetoed a bill in 1722 which the General Assembly had passed in order to bring the colony fully under all English statute law. Dulany led protests against this, writing a pamphlet entitled "The Right of the Inhabitants of Maryland, to the Benefit of the English Laws".

Lord Baltimore later appointed Dulany to the posts of Receiver General, Judge of Admiralty, and Commissary General, as well as appointing him to the Governor's Council.

Border dispute with Pennsylvania

In the 1730s, under the rule of Governor Samuel Ogle, Maryland became engaged in a border dispute with Pennsylvania.  Several settlers were taken prisoners on both sides and Penn sent a committee to Governor Ogle to resolve the situation.  Rioting broke out in the disputed territory and Ogle appealed to the King for resolution. In 1736 Ogle dispatched Dulany to Philadelphia in order to negotiate the release of a number of imprisoned Marylanders, though without success, and the border warfare continued.

Lawyer, planter, land developer
Dulany became wealthy from his legal practice, and through the 1720s began to accumulate and develop land. He advertised for tenants to settle his land in Baltimore, Kent and Prince Georges county, paying with tobacco, corn or wheat. He is credited with the founding of Frederick.

Family and legacy
Dulany married three times, first to Charity Courts Smallwood, widow of Bayne Smallwood. She died one year after wedding Daniel. By his second wife Rebecca Smith, the daughter of Colonel Walter Smith, he had a large family, not atypical for the time:
 Daniel Dulany the Younger (1722–1797), a noted Maryland Loyalist, Mayor of Annapolis, who played a prominent role in Maryland during the American Revolution.
 Walter Dulany (1722-1773), who would also become Mayor of Annapolis.
 Rebecca
 Rachel
 Mary
 Margaret, who married doctor Alexander Hamilton in 1747.

Daniel married a third time to Henrietta Maria Chew, a widow.  By her he had another child, Lloyd.

Dulany died on December 5, 1753 in Annapolis. At the time of his death he owned  of land.

After his death, in 1754, Dulany's third wife Henrietta Maria, appeared before Michael MacNamara, then Deputy Commissioner of Anne Arundel County, seeking to overturn the will of her late husband.

See also
 Colonial families of Maryland

Notes

References
 Andrews, Matthew Page, History of Maryland, Doubleday, New York (1929)
 Land, Aubrey C.  The Dulanys of Maryland: A Biographical Study of Daniel Dulany, the Elder (1685-1753), and Daniel Dulany, the Younger (1722-1797).  Baltimore, Maryland Historical Society: 1955.

1685 births
1753 deaths
American lawyers
Kingdom of Ireland emigrants to the Thirteen Colonies
People of colonial Maryland
Members of the Maryland General Assembly